Frederick Muir (1849 – 25 April 1921) was a New Zealand cricketer. He played one first-class match for Otago in 1872/73.

See also
 List of Otago representative cricketers

References

External links
 

1849 births
1921 deaths
New Zealand cricketers
Otago cricketers